Gabriel Leiva (born 27 August 1994 in Costa Rica) is a Costa Rican footballer midfielder who was last attached to Patriotas Boyacá of the Colombian Categoría Primera A league. Standing at 1.85m tall, he is physically strong, left-footed, and can be deployed as  a full-back.

Career

River Plate

Joining Argentinean giants River Plate in 2012 and becoming the first Costa Rican to play there in the process, the midfielder was to be in their reserve team until he turned 18, which would then allow him to be registered in their senior squad.

Czech Republic

In September 2014, Cartagines agreed to let Leiva test for with Czech club 1. FC Slovácko, with the trial ending on August 31. Playing three practice matches there, he scored 6 goals, with 1. FC Slovácko asking him to return by the end of his try-out there. The Costa Rican left in January 2015 for his second trial in the Czech Republic.

Patriotas Boyacá

Penning a three-year deal with Patriotas Boyacá of the Colombian Categoria Premier A in summer 2016, Leiva expressed benevolence at the opportunity, recording his first outing for the club in a 0-0 draw with Atlético Bucaramanga, entering in the 63rd minute.

References

Costa Rican footballers
Costa Rican expatriate footballers
Association football midfielders
Club Atlético River Plate footballers
Expatriate footballers in Argentina
Expatriate footballers in Colombia
1994 births
Living people
Costa Rica under-20 international footballers